The Knifegrinder (Spanish: El afilador) is an 1808-1812 easel painting by Francisco de Goya, which is now in Budapest.

History
The art historian Juliet Wilson–Bareau suggests that this work and The Water Bearer were painted for the painter's house in Madrid.
The painting was still in the possession of the artist in 1812. On the death of his wife Josefa Bayeu, he made an inventory of his paintings at Fuendetodos. The Knifegrinder was valued at 300 reales and catalogued under number 13, the same number as The Water Bearer and The Servant with a Pitcher.

According to the art historian Manuela Mena, the painting was sold directly to prince Alois Wenzel Kaunitz (ambassador to Spain from the Austrian Empire) by the painter after the Peninsular War. Shortly afterwards it was sold to Nicolas Esterházy - the Esterházy collection was acquired by the Hungarian state in 1870, forming the nucleus of the Museum of Fine Arts.

See also
List of works by Francisco Goya

References

External links

1812 paintings
Paintings by Francisco Goya
Paintings in the collection of the Museum of Fine Arts (Budapest)